Bravo! Vail is an annual classical music festival held in Vail, Colorado. Its current artistic director is Anne-Marie McDermott.

Overview
The six-week-long festival begins in late June and ends in early August. Programming consists of chamber music, classical music, jazz, and pops concerts provided by the Dallas Symphony Orchestra, The Philadelphia Orchestra, and the New York Philharmonic along with chamber music artists.

London's acclaimed Academy of St Martin in the Fields, led by violinist Joshua Bell, was added to the orchestral roster in 2016, making Bravo! Vail a four-orchestra festival. The Academy was both the first international and the first chamber orchestra residency in Bravo's history. In 2019, the Chamber Orchestra Vienna – Berlin featuring German violinist Anne Sophie Mutter will fill this fourth orchestra slot, opening the Bravo! Vail season in their North American and snowstorm debut.
In 2021, The Saint Paul Chamber Orchestra opened the Festival, returning in 2022 to open as well.

History
Bravo! Vail was founded in 1987 by John Giovando and Ida Kavafian.

Orchestral performances by the National Repertory Orchestra and the Colorado Springs Philharmonic Orchestra formed the early chamber concert series. The Rochester Philharmonic Orchestra joined the festival in 1989 and left in 2008. The Detroit Symphony Orchestra joined the festival in 1995, the Dallas Symphony Orchestra in 1999, the New York Philharmonic in 2003, and The Philadelphia Orchestra in 2007.

Flutist Eugenia Zukerman became the festival's artistic director in 1988. In 2011, pianist Anne-Marie McDermott replaced Zukerman.

In 2012, Giovando retired and James W. Palermo, who had recently served as CEO of the Colorado Symphony Association, became Bravo! Vail’s new executive director. Giovando returned to serve as interim executive director in December 2014.

In 2016, Jennifer Teisinger, formerly of the Sun Valley Summer Symphony, became the Festival's new executive director.

Caitlin Murray accepted the position of executive director in 2018. Murray has been associated with Bravo! Vail since 2009, most recently serving as the Vice President of Development.

Performance venues
Bravo! Vail utilizes many venues around Vail and the Eagle Valley during the season, including:
 Gerald R. Ford Amphitheater
 Vilar Performing Arts Center
 Vail Interfaith Chapel
 Edwards Interfaith Chapel and Community Center
 Donovan Pavilion
 Brush Creek Pavilion

Programming
In a typical season, Bravo! Vail provides a number of concerts and events, including:
 Orchestra concerts
 Chamber Music Series
 Classically Uncorked Series
 Free Concert Series
 Linda & Mitch Hart Soirée Series
 Bravo! Vail's Annual Gala
Free Family Concerts
Bravo! Vail After Dark
Education & Community Engagement Events
After-School Piano and Strings Programs
Master Classes
Piano Fellows Program
Pre-Concert Talks
Chamber Musicians in Residence Program
Luis D. Juarez Honorary Music Award
Internship Program

Artists and ensembles who have performed at Bravo! Vail
A number of artists and musical ensembles have performed at Bravo! Vail since it was founded. Below is a list of some of its notable performers:
 Academy of St Martin in the Fields
 Colorado Springs Philharmonic Orchestra
 Dallas Symphony Orchestra
 Colorado Symphony Orchestra
 Detroit Symphony Orchestra
 National Repertory Orchestra
 New York Philharmonic
 Rochester Philharmonic Orchestra
 The Philadelphia Orchestra
 Chamber Orchestra Vienna-Berlin
 The Saint Paul Chamber Orchestra

References

External links
Official Website

Classical music festivals in the United States
Classical music festivals
Music festivals in Colorado
Tourist attractions in Eagle County, Colorado
Recurring events established in 1987
1987 establishments in Colorado